The Kirirom National Park, officially the Preah Suramarit-Kossamak Kirirom National Park, is a national park in Cambodia. It is located mostly in Phnom Sruoch District, Kampong Speu Province, while a smaller section is in neighboring Koh Kong Province.

Legend
The meaning of "Kirirom" is "Happy Mountain". This name was given to the area by King Monivong in the 1930s. The ancient name of the place was Phnom Vorvong Sorvong for the main two hills there were connected with the Cambodian popular legend about two heroic princely brothers, Vorvong and Sorvong.

Description
The park extends over the eastern part of the Cardamom Mountains.
It is located 112 km from Phnom Penh of National Highway 4 on the road to Sihanoukville.

Lying at 675m (2,215 ft) above sea level, Kirirom was Cambodia's first officially designated national park.

It contains many footpaths through the forests with a number of small lakes and waterfalls and was once used as a refuge by the Khmer Rouge.

References

National parks of Cambodia
Protected areas established in 1993
Cardamom Mountains
Geography of Kampong Speu province
Geography of Koh Kong province
Tourist attractions in Kampong Speu province